Tears of Joy may refer to:

Theatre, Film and TV
Tears of Joy Theatre
Tears of Joy, Tears of Sorrow, TV movie starring John Forsythe 1986 
"Tears of Joy", TV episode Grace Under Fire, 1994  
"Tears of Joy", TV episode Mia and Me, 2012

Music

Albums
Tears of Joy (album), a 1971 album by Don Ellis, or the title song
Tears of Joy, a 1988 album by  Tuck & Patti
Tears of Joy, a 1991 album by Jo-El Sonnier
Tears of Joy, a 2005 album by Antonio Forcione
Tears of Joy, a 2015 album by J. Stalin

Songs
"Tears of Joy" (song), a song by Faith Evans
"Tears of Joy", a 1957 song by The "5" Royales
"Tears of Joy", a 1972 song by Eddie Floyd
"Tears of Joy", a 1992 song by Cherrelle
"Tears of Joy", a 1963 song by Chuck Jackson
"Tears of Joy", a song on the soundtrack for the 2015 film Inside Out

See also
 Tears
 Joy
 Face with Tears of Joy emoji